Michal Tabara (born 16 October 1979) is a former tennis player from the Czech Republic, who turned professional in 1997. The right-hander has won one singles title (2001, Chennai) so far in his career. Tabara reached his highest singles ATP-ranking on 23 July 2001, when he became world No. 47.

Tabara was involved in a minor controversy at the 2001 US Open.  After losing a first-round match to Justin Gimelstob in five sets, Tabara, who was allegedly frustrated by Gimelstob's frequent injury time-outs, spat in Gimelstob's direction as they approached the net to shake hands. Tabara was subsequently fined $1,000 for unsportmanslike behavior.

Tennis career

Juniors
As a junior Tabara reached as high as No. 9 in the junior world singles rankings in 1996 (and No. 24 in doubles).

Singles titles

Wins (1)

Doubles titles

Wins (1)

References

External links
 
 
 
 Michal Tabara stats

1979 births
Living people
Czech male tennis players
People from Uherské Hradiště
Sportspeople from the Zlín Region